According to the Book of Mormon, Neum was an old world prophet whose pre-Christian era writings were recorded upon the plates of brass. There is only one known instance where Neum is specifically cited in the Book of Mormon. In 1 Nephi 19:10, the prophet Nephi uses the paraphrased words of Neum to show that the coming Messiah would be killed by crucifixion.

Outside of the Book of Mormon, there is no evidence that Neum existed. However, there is evidence that writings of, and references to several ancient Israelite prophets were destroyed by the ruling class of the ancient Jews.  The best known example of this is a reference in the Dead Sea Scrolls to an ancient prophet known as the Teacher of Righteousness who was driven out of Jewish society because he preached of the coming of a Messiah. Outside of the Dead Sea Scrolls, there is no other reference to this person, and until 1950, there was absolutely no record of his existence.

The scrolls state that the Teacher of Righteousness was descended from another mysterious prophet named Zadok, which might have been a transcribed or altered version of the name Zenock, another prophet referenced only in the Book of Mormon.

See also
Zenos

References
 Pinegar, Ed J. & Allen, Richard J. Book of Mormon Who's Who

Book of Mormon prophets